Shorb ol Ayn (also Romanized as Shorb ol ‘Ayn and Shorb ol ‘Eyn) is a village in Kezab Rural District, Khezrabad District, Saduq County, Yazd Province, Iran. At the 2006 census, its population was 115, in 48 families.

References 

Populated places in Saduq County